Paramekkavu Vidya Mandir is a CBSE school run by Paramekkavu Devaswom located at MLA road, Kuttur in Thrissur district, Kerala, India.

As of 2021, the director is Kalyani Balakrishnan and the principals are Priti Vijayakumar and Sindhu.V. Affiliated to CBSE syllabus, this English Medium school conducts class for Primary to Senior Secondary Classes.

References

Schools in Thrissur district